The 1852 Illinois gubernatorial election was the tenth election for this office.  Democratic governor Augustus C. French did not seek re-election. Democrat Joel Aldrich Matteson was elected to succeed him.
At this time in Illinois history the Lieutenant Governor was elected on a separate ballot from the governor. This would remain the case until the adoption of the 1970 constitution.

Results

References
Illinois Blue Book 1899

Illinois
1852
Gubernatorial
November 1852 events